The 1886 United Kingdom general election took place from 1 to 27 July 1886, following the defeat of the Government of Ireland Bill 1886. It resulted in a major reversal of the results of the 1885 election as the Conservatives, led by Lord Salisbury, were joined in an electoral pact with the breakaway Unionist wing of the Liberals 
led by Lord Hartington (later the Duke of Devonshire) and Joseph Chamberlain. The new Liberal Unionist party gave the Conservatives their parliamentary majority but did not join them in a formal coalition.

William Ewart Gladstone's Liberals, who supported the Irish Home Rule movement, and their sometimes allies the Irish Parliamentary Party, led by Charles Stewart Parnell, were placed a distant second. This ended the period of Liberal dominance—they had held power for 18 of the 27 years since 1859 and won five of the six elections held during that time, but would only be in power for three of the next nineteen years. This was also the first election since the 1841 election that the Conservatives won a plurality or majority of the popular vote.

Results

|}

Vote summary

Seats summary

See also
List of MPs elected in the 1886 United Kingdom general election
Parliamentary franchise in the United Kingdom 1885–1918
1886 United Kingdom general election in Ireland

References

Further reading
 Blaxill, Luke. From: The War of Words: The Language of British Elections, 1880–1922 (2020) pp. 81–123.
 Roberts, Matthew. "Election Cartoons and Political Communication In Victorian England.' Cultural & Social History (2013) 10#3 pp 369–395, covers 1860 to 1890.

References

External links
Spartacus: Political Parties and Election Results
United Kingdom election results—summary results 1885–1979 

 
1886 elections in the United Kingdom
General election
1886
July 1886 events